Marianella Rojas (born November 3, 1989), known as Nella, is a Venezuelan singer, originally from Porlamar, Margarita Island, Venezuela.

Graduated from Berklee College of Music, she won a Latin Grammy Awards for "Best New Artist" in 2019. The single "Voy" from her first album, created in collaboration with Javier Limón, was chosen among the best 54 songs of 2019 by New York Times. She was a special guest in Alejandro Sanz’ last tour in the United States in 2019, and was invited by the conductor Gustavo Dudamel to perform a song composed by him in the documentary "Free Color " from the artist Cruz Diez, released in 2020. She has also collaborated with artists such as Jennifer Lopez, Carlos Vives, Luis Enrique, Susana Baca, Los Amigos Invisibles, Monsieur Periné and Caramelos de Cianuro. In early 2020, she was signed by the record label Sony Music Latin in which, she released her second studio album Doce margaritas in 2021.

Musical career 
She emigrated from her home island to Caracas, Canada and the United States to get musical education. She graduated from Berklee College of Music, where she met the composer, musician and music producer Javier Limon. Being an admirer of the singer Buika, she began to perform Andalusian music.

In 2018, she was invited to join as a singer and actress, the new movie Everybody Knows, from the Oscar-winning Iranian director, Asghar Farhadi, alongside Javier Bardem, Ricardo Darín and Penélope Cruz, where she performed several songs specially composed by Limon. Moreover, her voice was heard in the Cannes Festival since the film was chosen for the event opening.

The following year she held the Me Llaman Nella World Tour, where she offered a new set that included music from the film Everybody Knows, and Venezuelan folk songs. Her tour took her to stages in Venezuela, Panama, Mexico, United States, Spain and England.

Album "Voy" debut and international recognition 
In 2019, she performed at the Latin Grammy Award ceremony along with Alejandro Sanz, Greecy and Aitana, where she later won the category Best New Artist.

In May of the same year, Nella makes her first record called "Voy"; an album with compositions and production by Javier Limon for Casa Limón Records and worldwide distributed by The Orchard. Her debut album has been internationally recognized and her first single, "Voy", was chosen among the best 54 songs of 2019 by The New York Times. Months later, she performed during the Hispanic Heritage Month celebration in 2019, at the John F. Kennedy Center for the Performing Arts in Washington D.C., where she made a tribute dedicated to the strength of the Venezuelan people.

In 2019, she was a special guest of the singer Alejandro Sanz during his last tour in the United States, which took place in the American Airlines Arena in Miami and in the Microsoft Theater in Los Angeles. That same year she was invited by the conductor Gustavo Dudamel to perform a song composed by him for the documentary film Free Color by the artist Cruz Diez, directed by Beto Arvelo, and with the actor Edgard Ramirez as the narrator.

In March 2020, Nella signed with Sony Music Latin to release her next album in 2021.

Musical style 
Her music brings together the folklore of her native land, with contemporary sounds and a strong influence of Andalusian music, sung with a personal and expressive vocal style.

Discography 

 2019: Voy (IMG/Javier Limón Records).
2021: Doce margaritas (Sony Music Latin)

Awards 

 2019: "Mejor Artista Nuevo" at the Latin Grammy Awards.

References

External links 

 Official Page
 Official Facebook 
 Official Twitter

21st-century Venezuelan women singers
1989 births
Living people
Latin Grammy Award winners
Latin Grammy Award for Best New Artist
Berklee College of Music alumni
Women in Latin music